Matías Isidoro Presentado (born 13 August 1992) is an Argentine footballer who plays for Los Andes as a centre-back.

Career 

He made his league debut in the 2014–15 season.

References

External links
  
 
 

1992 births
Living people
Argentine footballers
Argentine expatriate footballers
Sportspeople from Mar del Plata
Association football central defenders
Argentine people of Uruguayan descent
Sportspeople of Uruguayan descent
Afro-Argentine sportspeople
Estudiantes de La Plata footballers
Defensores de Cambaceres footballers
Club Atlético Alvarado players
Caracas FC players
Crucero del Norte footballers
Deportivo Madryn players
Gimnasia y Esgrima de Concepción del Uruguay footballers
Club Atlético Los Andes footballers
Argentine Primera División players
Venezuelan Primera División players
Argentine expatriate sportspeople in Venezuela
Expatriate footballers in Venezuela